Luo Yonghao (Chinese: 罗永浩, b. 9 July 1972) is a Chinese entrepreneur and internet celebrity. He  is the chief executive officer and founder of Chinese technology company Smartisan and founder of now defunct blogging website Bullog.cn.

On August 20, 2018, Luo's company Smartisan launched the messaging service Bullet Message, which gained 7 million users in its first three weeks.

Early life 
Luo was born to a Korean Chinese family in Helong, Jilin, China. His father is the party secretary of Helong county Luo Changzhen (Chinese: 罗昌珍). At age 12, his family moved to Yanji and he transferred to Beishan Primary School. In his second year of high school, Luo dropped out. Luo pursued various business endeavors, including selling second-hand books and reselling smuggled cars. However, after economic pressure he decided to study English and pursue a career teaching English.

Career 
In 2001, Luo became a teacher at New Oriental in Beijing. From 2001 to 2006, Yonghao prepared students for the GRE test. Because of his humorous teaching style and often off-topic tangents, a few of his students filmed him and uploaded some of his lectures online. The videos, titled "Lao Luo Quotations", became popular with young people. Luo, nicknamed Lao Luo by his students, became an internet phenomenon and was featured in Baidu's annual top-searches between 2005 and 2006. In June 2006, Luo Yonghao resigned from New Oriental.

Bullog.cn 
On July 31, 2006, Luo launched Bullog.cn, citing dissatisfaction with the censorship of the major blog portals such as sina.com and sohu.com. The site was considered to be one of the most liberal blog portals in Chinese cyberspace.

Luo opened his portal in 2006. His words and recordings aimed to inspire independent thinking and sticking to life mottoes. Some excerpts that satirized or criticized unreasonable situations and misdemeanors aroused sympathy among netizens, and spread rapidly over the Internet. This became a topic of the year on the Chinese Internet.

References

External links

 
 Luo Yonghao on Youku

1972 births
Living people
21st-century Chinese businesspeople
Chinese company founders
Chinese computer businesspeople
Chinese people of Korean descent
New Oriental people